The Elephant Whisperers is a 2022  Tamil-language Indian short Academy award winning documentary film directed by documentary filmmaker Kartiki Gonsalves in her directorial debut. The documentary is about the bond that develops between a couple and an orphaned baby elephant, Raghu, who was entrusted to their care. Produced by Sikhya Entertainment, the film had its world premiere on 9 November 2022 at Doc NYC Film Festival, a film festival for documentaries in the United States. 

The film was released by Netflix globally on 8 December 2022 for streaming. It won the Academy Award for Best Documentary Short Film at the 95th Academy Awards, making it the first Indian film to win an Academy Award in that category.

About 

The Elephant Whisperers tells the story of an indigenous couple named Bomman and Bellie who are entrusted with an orphaned baby Indian elephant named Raghu. They take great pains to ensure that the fragile, injured infant survives and grows to be a healthy juvenile. A strong bond develops between the couple and the elephant. Set in the Mudumalai National Park in the state of Tamil Nadu, India, the documentary also highlights the natural beauty of the location. It explores the life of the tribal people in harmony with nature. 

The film is not just a heart-touching story of a bond between animal and human and co-existence, but also showcases Indian culture and tradition of environment conservation.

Production 

Kartiki Gonsalves spent five years following human-elephant blended family belonging to Kattunayakan tribe to make this documentary. As she stated, "I met Raghu [the baby elephant] when he was exactly three months old," she added, "I spent about a year and a half with him when he was a tiny baby before this became a documentary." While filming the documentary, her team also photographed other inhabitants of the reserve, including leopards, tigers, and monkeys.

Reception 

On the review aggregator Rotten Tomatoes website, the film has an approval rating of 100% based on 5 reviews, with an average rating of 7.7/10. 

Romey Norton of Ready Steady Cut rated the film 3.5 out of 5 and said that "It packs a small punch and is definitely worth the watch, especially if you love elephants." Poulomi Das, reviewing for Firstpost, wrote that the "narrative is fairly straightforward, [and] the storytelling manages to be simultaneously gentle and persuasive." Praising the cinematography, Das wrote "the film is elevated by its stunning cinematography." Das opined that "Much of the beauty of the film lies in the understated coming-of-age of the film’s narrative that draws ample parallels between humans and animals." Das said that The Elephant Whisperers "is ultimately a love-story about the power of community," and concluded by saying, "the film champions the dignity of — all kinds of — life." Manjeet Singh of Leisure Byte, reviewing the film, praised it, writing, "the complete documentary appears more like an experience that needs to be felt, than rather just to be seen." Singh opined that "The docufilm is capable of making you cry, or even sob" and it is "the finest presentation of the year."

Accolades

See also 

 Submissions for Best Documentary Short Academy Award
 Mudumalai National Park
 Theppakadu Elephant Camp
 Tamil Nadu Forest Department

Notes

References

External links 

 
 
 
 High on Films review
 Leisure Byte review

Indian short documentary films
Documentary films about elephants
Films shot in Tamil Nadu
American short documentary films
2022 short documentary films
Films by Indian directors
Best Documentary Short Subject Academy Award winners